Dr. Saeed Bin Qasim Bin Yahya Al-Khalidi is a Saudi Arabian academic and former Member of the Consultative Assembly of Saudi Arabia. He is an associate Professor in the College of Business at King Khalid University.

A graduate of Imam Mohammad Ibn Saud Islamic University, he completed an MSc in Computer Science at the University of East Anglia in 2001, and subsequently completed a PhD in Information Systems at East Anglia in 2006.

References

Year of birth missing (living people)
Living people
Imam Muhammad ibn Saud Islamic University alumni
Alumni of the University of East Anglia
Academic staff of King Khalid University
Members of the Consultative Assembly of Saudi Arabia